Stevia World Agrotech Pvt Ltd is an agrotechnology company specializing in the growing and processing of stevia leaves, headquartered in Bangalore, India. The company primarily focuses on growing and processing stevia at relatively low costs, adhering to high environmental standards using good agricultural practices. Stevia World provides services to farmers for contract-based farming.

Stevia
Stevia is a nutrient-rich herb of the Asteraceae family, typically growing along the edges of the rainforests of Paraguay. Locals claim it was initially used by their ancestors more than a millennium ago, both for its intense sweet taste and medicinal qualities. Consisting of more than 100 essential nutrients that have been discovered, the leaves can be 30 times sweeter than normal sugar, depending upon the type, geographic location, and period of harvest. The type correlates to the amount and blend of glycosides within each stevia unit.

Products
 Cerovia Jar
 Cerovia Sachet
 Healthy Leaf
 Sweetxx
 Rebaudioside A

References

External links
 Official Website

Sugar substitutes
Stevia (genus)
Companies based in Bangalore
2013 establishments in Karnataka
Agriculture companies established in 2013
Indian companies established in 2013